Haimen is a town of Chaoyang District, Shantou, in the east of Guangdong province, China, and is situated on the South China Sea coast. In December 2011, it was the site of protests where thousands of demonstrators spoke out over plans to expand a coal-fired power plant in the town.

References 

Township-level divisions of Guangdong
Shantou